Harayjan (also Romanized as Harāyjān; also known as Harāyjān-e Bālā and Harījān) is a village in Hamaijan Rural District, Hamaijan District, Sepidan County, Fars Province, Iran. At the 2006 census, its population was 1,250, in 292 families.

References 

Populated places in Sepidan County